The Chihuahua monster truck accident occurred on 5 October 2013 in Chihuahua City, Mexico when a monster truck crashed into spectators at an air show. Eight people were reported killed, including children, and 79 were injured. Officials and event organizers were blamed for the disaster. To date, it is the deadliest monster truck incident to have occurred.

Accident 
The Extreme Aeroshow was being held at the El Rejon dam, on the outskirts of Chihuahua City. Carlos Gonzalez, spokesman for the Chihuahua state prosecutors' office, said that the driver "appeared to lose control of the truck after leaping over cars it was crushing during a demonstration".

It was reported that the outdoor arena lacked any visible barriers.

The driver was detained and said in a statement that he hit his head on something inside the cabin and lost consciousness.

Investigation 
Governor of Chihuahua César Duarte Jáquez said his administration was investigating whether the Civil Protection authorities had correctly enforced safety regulations. Governor Jáquez announced 3 days of mourning.

Francisco Velázquez Samaniego, the driver of the monster truck, was convicted of reckless homicide and inflicting injury and damage. He was sentenced to five years in prison and ordered to pay MXN$26million in restitution. Velázquez  maintained that he was unconscious at the time of the accident, and that he had warned organizers that the spectators were too close. He was the only person convicted  in relation to the accident.

References 

History of Chihuahua (state)
2013 disasters in North America
2013 in Mexico
October 2013 events in Mexico
Road incidents in Mexico